The 2011 LPGA Championship was the 57th LPGA Championship, held June 23–26 at Locust Hill Country Club in Pittsford, New York, a suburb southeast of Rochester. Known for sponsorship reasons as the Wegmans LPGA Championship, it was the second of four major championships on the LPGA Tour during the 2011 season. This was the second of four consecutive years the LPGA Championship was played at Locust Hill.

The champion was Yani Tseng, age 22, with a 269 (−19) to win by ten strokes over Morgan Pressel. It was Tseng's second LPGA Championship victory (2008) and fourth major championship.  It was her third victory of 2011 and eighth career win on the LPGA Tour. It was the second consecutive year with a double-digit victory margin. Defending champion Cristie Kerr tied for third, eleven strokes back; she won by twelve strokes in 2010.

Course layout

Field
The field was composed of 150 players, which included one amateur, with the cut to the top 70 players and ties after the second round.

Past champions in the field

All eight former champions in the field made the cut.

Tournament summary

First round
Thursday, June 23, 2011

Source:

Second round
Friday, June 24, 2011

The cut was at 146 (+2) or better and 78 players advanced to play on the weekend. The only amateur, 18-year-old Danielle Kang, made the cut. Kang was the U.S. Women's Amateur champion in 2010 and would repeat in 2011.

Source:

Third round
Saturday, June 25, 2011

Source:

Final round
Sunday, June 26, 2011

Source:

References

External links
LPGA Tour leaderboard

Women's PGA Championship
Golf in New York (state)
LPGA Championship
LPGA Championship
LPGA Championship
LPGA Championship